Miloš Jokić (born 7 June 1987) is a professional Serbian footballer who currently plays for PAO Koufalia.

External links
 HLSZ 
 

1987 births
Living people
Serbian footballers
Association football midfielders
Serbian expatriate footballers
FK Metalac Gornji Milanovac players
FK Dinamo Vranje players
FK Olimpik players
FK Čukarički players
FK BASK players
Szolnoki MÁV FC footballers
Vasas SC players
FC Metalurh Zaporizhzhia players
PAS Lamia 1964 players
Trikala F.C. players
Doxa Drama F.C. players
FK Proleter Novi Sad players
Kalamata F.C. players
Premier League of Bosnia and Herzegovina players
Serbian SuperLiga players
Serbian First League players
Nemzeti Bajnokság I players
Ukrainian Premier League players
Ukrainian First League players
Football League (Greece) players
Expatriate footballers in Bosnia and Herzegovina
Serbian expatriate sportspeople in Bosnia and Herzegovina
Expatriate footballers in Hungary
Serbian expatriate sportspeople in Hungary